Chaudhary Sajid Mehmood is a Pakistani politician who had been a member of the Provincial Assembly of the Punjab from August 2018 till January 2023

Political career

He was elected to the Provincial Assembly of the Punjab as a candidate of Pakistan Tehreek-e-Insaf from Constituency PP-9 (Rawalpindi-IV) in 2018 Pakistani general election. He received 51,686 votes and defeated Chaudry Sajid Mehmood, a candidate of Pakistan Peoples Party (PPP).

References

Living people
Punjab MPAs 2018–2023
Pakistan Tehreek-e-Insaf MPAs (Punjab)
Year of birth missing (living people)